Shelby E. Linville (November 8, 1929 – August 5, 2008) was an American basketball player and educator best known for his college career at the University of Kentucky.

Linville was born in Dayton, Kentucky and moved to Middletown, Ohio at 15. He starred at Middletown High School, where he led the team to two state championships.

Following his standout college career, Linville first attended Miami University, then transferred to Kentucky to play for Adolph Rupp. Linville played three seasons at Kentucky, the best of which was his junior campaign where he averaged 10.4 points per game and helped lead the 1950–51 Wildcats to the 1951 National Championship. Linville had a strong NCAA tournament showing, making the All-Final Four team alongside teammate Bill Spivey.

After graduating in 1952, Linville became a high school teacher, coach and administrator. He was also a Baptist minister.

Linville died on August 5, 2008.

References

External links
College statistics at BigBlueHistory.net

1929 births
2008 deaths
American men's basketball players
Baptists from Kentucky
Basketball players from Kentucky
Basketball players from Ohio
Forwards (basketball)
High school basketball coaches in the United States
Kentucky Wildcats men's basketball players
Miami University alumni
People from Dayton, Kentucky
Sportspeople from Middletown, Ohio
20th-century Baptist ministers from the United States